De Tornaco is a Belgian and Luxembourgish noble family.

Members

Arnould François de Tornaco (1696-1766)
Charles Auguste de Tornaco (1763-1837), industrialist and mayor of Luxembourg City, married Elisabeth de Berlo-Suys.
Algegonde Ursula de Tornaco (1803-1856) married Adrien de Lannoy-Clervaux (1793-1854)
Sidonie de Tornaco (1804-1876)
Victor de Tornaco (1805-1875), prime minister of Luxembourg
Charles de Tornaco (1847-1912)
Raymond de Tornaco
Charles de Tornaco (1927-1953), Belgian Formula 2 and Formula 1 driver
Mathilde de Tornaco (1813-1885)
Camille de Tornaco (1807-1880)
Auguste de Tornaco (?)
Arnould de Tornaco (1840-1885)
Jean-Théodore de Tornaco de Vervoz

See also

Tornaco Castle

Luxembourgian noble families